The Martha Layne Collins Blue Grass Parkway is a controlled-access highway running from Elizabethtown, Kentucky to Woodford County, Kentucky, for a length of 71.134 miles (114.479 km). It intersects with Interstate 65 at its western terminus, and U.S. Route 60 at its eastern terminus. It is one of seven highways that are part of the Kentucky parkway system. The road is designated unsigned Kentucky Route 9002 (BG 9002). It is constructed similar to the Interstate Highway system, though sections do not measure up to current Interstate standards.

History

As a toll road
The parkway was opened in November 1965 as the Kentucky Bluegrass parkway (the "Kentucky" was dropped a few years later) and was originally a toll road, as were all Kentucky parkways. The parkway route largely parallels that of U.S. Route 62. State law requires that toll collection ceases when enough tolls are collected to pay off the parkway's construction bonds; that occurred in 1991.

Toll plazas and charges
The table below shows the locations of the former toll plazas, and toll charges that were previously charged for consumer-sized, or class 1 vehicles.

Name changes

In 2003, the road was renamed in honor of Martha Layne Collins, the first female governor of Kentucky. Previously, it was the Kentucky Bluegrass parkway (and signed as "KB Parkway"), then later renamed the "Blue Grass Parkway" (sometimes with "Bluegrass" as one word, though in the highway's name, it was officially two words), and often called the "BG Parkway" because of the abbreviation once used on its original signs from 1965 until they were replaced by a shield with the Collins name in 2003.

Route description
The parkway begins in Hardin County, at its I-65 junction near Elizabethtown. The parkway traverses Nelson, northern Washington, northern Mercer, southern Anderson, and Woodford counties, passing Bardstown, Lawrenceburg, and ending just east of Versailles.

The toll plazas, which were removed in 1991, were located at the following locations: 
Exit 10 at Boston
Exit 34 at Bloomfield, and
Exit 59 at Lawrenceburg.

Proposals

Connection with Interstate 64

No connection to I-64 was planned as it had not been constructed and would not open until the late 1970s.

By the time the road opened, however, it was first named the Kentucky Bluegrass parkway, and then later renamed just the Bluegrass Parkway. There have been talks for a direct connection from the eastern terminus of the parkway at US 60 to I-64, but all have failed. Such a connection would almost certainly draw enormous opposition in the Lexington area due to the many horse farms that would be adversely affected; the thoroughbred breeding industry is an important direct employer and a major tourist draw in the region.

Exit list

References

 Carlyle, Jeffrey. "Re: Lexington loop?" Online posting. May 1, 2002. May 1, 2002.
 "Report on Examination of Financial Statements and Supplemental Data — Central Kentucky Toll Road (Bluegrass Parkway)." Cook and Taylor Certified Public Accountants. June 30, 1982. Accessed March 12, 2004.

External links

9002
Kentucky parkway system
Transportation in Anderson County, Kentucky
Transportation in Hardin County, Kentucky
Transportation in Mercer County, Kentucky
Transportation in Nelson County, Kentucky
Transportation in Washington County, Kentucky
Transportation in Woodford County, Kentucky